I Walk Alone is a 1947 film noir directed by Byron Haskin and starring Burt Lancaster and Lizabeth Scott, with a supporting cast featuring Wendell Corey and Kirk Douglas.

This was the first of five films that Burt Lancaster and Kirk Douglas made together over the decades, including Gunfight at the O.K. Corral (1957) with Lancaster as Wyatt Earp and Douglas as Doc Holliday, The Devil's Disciple (1959) with Laurence Olivier, Seven Days in May (1964) with Fredric March and Ava Gardner, and Tough Guys (1986). Douglas was always billed beneath Lancaster but, with the exception of I Walk Alone, their roles were almost of equal importance.

A restoration of the film played at the Noir City festival at the Castro Theatre in February 2018.  The movie was officially released on home video for the first time on July 24, 2018.

Plot
Frankie Madison and Noll "Dink" Turner are rum-running partners during Prohibition. They get into a shootout with some would-be hijackers after their liquor, attracting the attention of the police. The two men split up, but not before making a bargain that if one is caught, he will still get an equal share when he gets out of jail. Frankie is sent to prison for 14 years. When he is finally set free, he goes to see Noll.

In the interim, Noll has built up a swanky nightclub. When the impatient Frankie shows up there, Noll stalls, sending him to dinner with his singer girlfriend Kay Lawrence. Noll instructs Kay to find out what Frankie is after. He learns that Frankie expects him to honor their old bargain. He tells his old partner that the deal only applied to their old nightclub, which shut down years ago. Dave, the only member of the old gang Frankie trusted, had him sign legal papers to that effect some time ago. Frankie's share by Noll's reckoning is less than $3000. Furious, Frankie slugs Noll and leaves to recruit men to take what he figures he is owed. However, Noll had Dave tie up ownership of the nightclub between several corporations, with bylaws that make it impossible for him to hand over anything. Furthermore, the men supposedly backing Frankie actually work for Noll. Frankie is beaten up and left in the alley.

Meanwhile, Noll informs Kay that he intends to marry wealthy socialite Alexis Richardson, explaining that he is doing so to ensure the success of the nightclub with which he has become increasingly obsessed. He sees no reason he and Kay cannot continue their relationship. Repulsed by the idea and strongly attracted to Frankie, Kay quits and, overcoming Frankie's suspicions, joins his side.

Dave, aghast at how Frankie has been treated, tells him that he is willing to pass along what he knows, which is enough to bring Noll down. However, he foolishly tells Noll what he intends to do, and is killed by Noll's henchman. The murder is pinned on Frankie.

Evading a police manhunt, Frankie and Kay go to Noll's mansion. Though Noll is waiting with a loaded gun, Frankie manages to take it away from him. The three drive to the nightclub. By threatening Noll, Frankie extracts a written confession from him, which he gives to the police when they show up. Noll is taken away, but gets free and goes gunning for Frankie. He is shot dead by a policeman.

Cast

Reception

Bosley Crowther, film critic for the New York Times, gave the film a negative review, also pointing out that the film may have violated the Motion Picture Production Code.  He wrote, "It is notable that the slant of sympathy is very strong toward the mug who did the "stretch," as though he were some kind of martyr. Nice thing! Producer Hal Wallis should read the Code."

James Agee, writing in The Nation, opined that the film should be made to "walk alone, tinkle a little bell, and cry, 'Unclean, unclean.'"

Variety, however, called I Walk Alone "a tight, hard-boiled melodrama."

A portion of I Walk Alone was used in 1982's Dead Men Don't Wear Plaid in which footage of Kirk Douglas is edited as if his character was speaking to Steve Martin's character of Rigby Reardon.

References

External links
 
 
 
 
 

1947 films
1947 crime drama films
American crime drama films
American black-and-white films
Film noir
American gangster films
Paramount Pictures films
Films directed by Byron Haskin
Films produced by Hal B. Wallis
Films scored by Victor Young
1947 directorial debut films
1940s American films
1940s English-language films